Guillaume Tell (8 July 1902 – 6 October 1998) was a French long-distance runner. He competed at the 1924 Summer Olympics and the 1928 Summer Olympics.

References

External links
 

1902 births
1998 deaths
Athletes (track and field) at the 1928 Summer Olympics
Athletes (track and field) at the 1924 Summer Olympics
French male long-distance runners
French male marathon runners
Olympic athletes of France